Enrique García Asensio (born 22 August 1937 in Valencia, Spain) is a Spanish orchestral conductor. In 1970, He was made as Professor of Orchestral Conducting at the Madrid Royal Conservatory. Asensio was also the conductor of the Spanish Radio and Television Symphony Orchestra (RTVE) from 1966 to 1984 and from 1998 to 2001.

In 1997, due to a Spanish law that prohibited holding two positions financed with public funds simultaneously (professor at the Madrid Royal Conservatory and conductor of the RTVE orchestra in his case), Asensio resigned from his position as professor of the Madrid Royal Conservatory. In 1999, he conducted the Euskadi Symphony Orchestra at the 38th edition of the Week of Religious Music in Cuenca. In 2000, he conducted the RTVE Orchestra for the reopening of the remodeled Kursaal Center.

Enrique García Asensio was also Principal Conductor and Music Director of the Municipal Symphonic Band of Madrid. Until September 2012, when the Municipal Symphonic Band of Madrid announced that they were looking for a new conductor to replace Asensio who stepped down the following month after 16 years conducting the Band.

References

External links
 
 Biography 

Spanish conductors (music)
Male conductors (music)
Living people
1937 births
Academic staff of the Madrid Royal Conservatory
21st-century conductors (music)
21st-century male musicians
Spanish male musicians